Abdoulaye Bernard Keita is a Guinean politician who represents the constituency of Coyah Prefecture. He is a member of the Majority Rally of the Guinean People Party of former president Alpha Conde. He was formerly the questor in charge of finances.

References

Rally of the Guinean People politicians
People from Coyah
Living people
Year of birth missing (living people)
Members of the National Assembly (Guinea)